Lugovoye is a rural locality (a selo) and the administrative center of Plotnikovsky Selsoviet, Kamensky District, Altai Krai, Russia. The population was 769 as of 2013. There are 17 streets.

Geography 
Lugovoye is located 39 km southeast of Kamen-na-Obi (the district's administrative centre) by road. Podgorny is the nearest rural locality.

References 

Rural localities in Kamensky District, Altai Krai